"One Owner Heart" is a song written by Walt Aldridge, Mac McAnally and Tom Brasfield, and recorded by American country music artist T. G. Sheppard.  It was released in November 1984 as the second single and title track from the album One Owner Heart.  The song reached #4 on the Billboard Hot Country Singles & Tracks chart.

Chart performance

References

1985 singles
T. G. Sheppard songs
Songs written by Walt Aldridge
Songs written by Mac McAnally
Song recordings produced by Jim Ed Norman
Warner Records singles
Curb Records singles
Songs written by Tom Brasfield
1984 songs